Palzor Tamang (born 22 February 1993) is an Indian cricketer. He made his List A debut for Sikkim in the 2018–19 Vijay Hazare Trophy on 20 September 2018. He made his first-class debut for Sikkim in the 2018–19 Ranji Trophy on 1 November 2018. He made his Twenty20 debut for Sikkim in the 2018–19 Syed Mushtaq Ali Trophy on 21 February 2019. In January 2020, he became the first cricketer for Sikkim to take a five-wicket haul in first-class cricket, doing so in the match against Manipur in the 2019–20 Ranji Trophy.

References

External links
 

1993 births
Living people
Indian cricketers
Sikkim cricketers
Place of birth missing (living people)